Deeping may refer to:

The settlements of, and within The Deepings in Lincolnshire, England:
Market Deeping
Deeping St James
Deeping St Nicholas
Deeping Gate
West Deeping
 Warwick Deeping (1877-1950), English author
 HMT Warwick Deeping, British anti-submarine trawler in World War II